Jesper Kewe Karlström (born 21 June 1995) is a Swedish professional footballer who plays as a midfielder for Ekstraklasa club Lech Poznań and the Sweden national team.

Club career

Early career 
Karlström started out his career playing for Hammarby IF at the age of six. When he turned nine the coach of his team moved to IF Brommapojkarna and brought his entire youth team along with him to the new club, including Karlström.

IF Brommapojkarna 
Shortly after his eighteenth birthday in 2013, Karlström made his Allsvenskan debut for Brommapojkarna away against Kalmar FF. At the start of the next year he scored for the first time when his game-winning goal in the last game of the 2013–14 Svenska Cupen group stage qualified the club for the knockout stage of the tournament. A few months later he also scored his first league goal in the 3–0 home win against IFK Norrköping.

Djurgårdens IF 
Brommapojkarna were relegated at the end of the 2014 Allsvenskan season, but Karlström had performed well enough to be signed by the larger Stockholm club Djurgårdens IF on a four-year deal. Ahead of 2017 Karlström had his shirt number changed from 22 to 6. On 10 May 2018, he played as Djurgarden beat Malmö FF 3–0 in the Swedish Cup Final.

In 2019 Karlström crowned himself as a Swedish champion as part of the Djurgårdens IF team that won the Swedish league for a twelfth time. Jesper contributed with the 2–1 goal in the remarkable second-half comeback to win the title.

Lech Poznań 
On 2 December 2020, Lech Poznań announced Karlström had signed from Djurgårdens IF on a contract until June 2024.

International career
Karlström has represented Sweden at the U17, U19 and U21 levels. In November 2014 he made his debut for the Sweden national under-21 football team against Austria.

He made his full international debut for the Sweden national team on 11 January 2018 in a friendly 1–0 win against Denmark, playing for 66 minutes before being replaced by Kristoffer Olsson.

Career statistics

International

Honours
Djurgårdens IF
 Allsvenskan: 2019
 Svenska Cupen: 2017–18

Lech Poznań
 Ekstraklasa: 2021–22

References

External links

Living people
1995 births
Footballers from Stockholm
Swedish footballers
Association football midfielders
IF Brommapojkarna players
Djurgårdens IF Fotboll players
Lech Poznań players
Allsvenskan players
Ekstraklasa players
Sweden under-21 international footballers
Sweden youth international footballers
Swedish expatriate footballers
Swedish expatriate sportspeople in Poland
Expatriate footballers in Poland